Cheick Tidiane Niang (born 8 December 1996) is a Malian football striker for Djoliba AC.

References

External links

1995 births
Living people
Malian footballers
Mali international footballers
Djoliba AC players
Association football forwards
21st-century Malian people